Muang Yai is a village and tambon (subdistrict) of Wiang Kaen District, in Chiang Rai Province, Thailand. In 2005, it had a population of 7,449 people. The tambon contains nine villages.

References

Tambon of Chiang Rai province
Populated places in Chiang Rai province